Olivedale is a suburb of Johannesburg, South Africa. It is located in Region C of the City of Johannesburg Metropolitan Municipality.

Olivedale is a small suburb in the greater Randburg area in the City of Johannesburg. It originated as a farm, Olivedale, and the original farmhouse, along with the original farm windmill, still exists today. The windmill now forms part of the area's main nursery school.

References

Johannesburg Region C